The Moluccan masked owl (Tyto sororcula), also known as the lesser masked owl, is a species of owl in the barn owl family. It is endemic to the south Moluccas of Indonesia. Some taxonomists consider this species to be conspecific with the Australian masked owl.

References

Moluccan masked owl
Birds of the Maluku Islands
Moluccan masked owl
Moluccan masked owl
Taxonomy articles created by Polbot
Taxobox binomials not recognized by IUCN